, formerly known as The Institute for Research in Human Happiness, is a controversial new religious and spiritual movement, which has been characterized as a cult.

The Happy Science group includes a publication division called IRH Press, schools such as Happy Science Academy and Happy Science University, a political party called the Happiness Realization Party, and three media entertainment divisions, which are called New Star Production, ARI Production and HS Pictures Studio.

The group was founded in Japan on 6 October 1986 by former Wall Street trader Ryuho Okawa, whose followers regard him as the incarnation of a supreme being from Venus.

History
According to Ryuho Okawa, its aim is "to bring happiness to humanity by spreading truth". Before its foundation, Ryuho Okawa had published various books of "spiritual messages" that claim to channel the words spoken by religious and historical figures such as Jesus Christ, Confucius and Nichiren. In 1987, he printed The Laws of the Sun, The Golden Laws, and The Laws of Eternity, forming the core textbooks of Happy Science, along with its fundamental sutra The Dharma of the Right Mind.

Teachings
The basic teachings of Happy Science are "Exploration of the Right Mind", "The Fourfold Path", and El Cantare belief. According to Okawa, in order to obtain happiness one must practice the Principles of Happiness known as "The Fourfold Path": love that gives, wisdom, self-reflection, and progress. The only requirement to join Happy Science is that applicants must have "the aspiration and discipline to seek the truth and actively contribute to the realization of love, peace and happiness on Earth". Among other teachings, they believe in the existence of reincarnation, angels, demons, heaven and hell, and aliens. Members of Happy Science attend  training courses (研修会, kenshūkai) and "qualification seminars" (資格セミナー, shikaku seminā) in order to increase their level within the groups hierarchy.

At the same time, the organization's political wing, the Happiness Realization Party, promotes political views that include support for Japanese military expansion, support for the use of nuclear deterrence, and denial of historical events such as the Nanjing Massacre in China and the comfort women issue in South Korea—see the Japanese-language version of the organization's online news bulletin, The Liberty. Some other views include infrastructure spending, natural disaster prevention, urban development, and dam construction. They also advocate fiscal conservatism, strengthening the US-Japan alliance, and a virtue-based leadership. As of the spring of 2018, the Happiness Realization Party has 21 local councilors.

Object of worship
Happy Science worships a deity named El Cantare who they believe is the "Highest God of Earth, the Lord of all gods". They believe that the being was first born on Earth 330 million years ago and that it is the same entity that has been worshipped at different times as Elohim, Odin, Thoth, Ophealis (Osiris), Hermes and Shakyamuni Buddha, with Okawa himself as the current incarnation.

Facilities

General headquarters, worship facilities, and missionary sites are located in Japan and other countries. Worship facilities are called Shoja (精舎 or vihara in Sanskrit) or Shoshinkan (正心館). In 1994, the first overseas branch, "Happiness Science USA" was established in New York. The organisation has branches in several countries including South Korea, Brazil, Uganda, the UK, Australia, India and Singapore. In addition to places of worship, Happy Science also operates two boarding schools in Nasu and Ōtsu, Japan.

Controversy
Happy Science is one of many Japanese new religions (shinshūkyō), which are looked upon as "controversial" by the mainstream press and public. According to The Japan Times, "for many, the Happies smell suspiciously like a cult". Not only the domestic Japanese press, but also international media have applied the term "cult" to Happy Science. 

Through the 1990's the group had a bitter rivalry with doomsday cult Aum Shinrikyo culminating in a failed assassination attempt on Okawa using the nerve agent VX injected into his car's air conditioning. It was one of many VX attacks by Aum members leading up to the 1995 Tokyo subway sarin attack which killed 14 and injured more than 5000 people.  

Happy Science has also released promotional videos claiming, without evidence, that North Korea and the People's Republic of China are plotting the nuclear destruction of Japan. The group has sold "spiritual vaccines," falsely claiming that they prevent and cure COVID-19, advertised virus-related blessings at rates from US$100 to over US$400, and sold coronavirus-themed DVDs and CDs of Okawa lecturing, which make false claims of supposedly boosting immunity, . After initially defying physical distancing measures, it later closed its New York temple, announcing that it had administered their fraudulent "vaccines" remotely.

In February 2017, actress Fumika Shimizu abruptly retired from her former entertainment production agency amidst multiple filming projects for a full-time role in Happy Science, declaring she had been a member of the group since childhood, under the influence of her parents, both of whom were longtime believers in Happy Science.

Okawa's son and potential successor, Hiroshi Okawa, left the movement and is now one of its outspoken critics. In an article in The New York Times, he commented, "I believe what my father does is complete nonsense". His father has denounced Hiroshi as "demonic" and has sued him for defamation. In a 2022 interview with The World, Hiroshi described Happy Science as a "cult". Regarding Ryuho Okawa's spiritual channeling sessions, Hiroshi said "It's just a performance". Hiroshi also estimated the number of Happy Science members to be around 13,000.

On February 10, 2022, the fifth chapter of anthology manga "Kami-sama" no Iru Ie de Sodachimashita ~Shūkyō 2-Sei na Watashi-tachi~ (A Home Life With God ~We Children Born Into Religion~) written by Mariko Kikuchi as a criticism of Happy Science and other fringe religious organizations was removed by the publisher, Shueisha following backlash from Happy Science. The other chapters were removed on March 17, 2022. It was later reported by the Weekly Flash magazine in April.

References

Notes

Further reading
 
 Baffelli, E; Reader, Ian (2011). Competing for the apocalypse: religious rivalry and millennial transformations in a Japanese new religion. International Journal for the Study of New Religions 2 (1), 5-28
  Clarke, Peter B. (ed.) (1999), 'Kofuku-no-Kagaku: The Institute for Research in Human Happiness' in A Bibliography of Japanese New Religious Movements: With Annotations, Surrey, UK, Japan Library (Curzon), pp. 149–67
 Pokorny, Lukas; Winter, Franz (2012). Creating Utopia': The History of Kofuku no Kagaku in Austria, 1989–2012, with an Introduction to Its General History and Doctrine. In: Hödl, Hans Gerald and Lukas Pokorny, ed. Studies on Religion in Austria. Volume 1, Vienna: Praesens, pp. 31–79
 

 Yamashita, Akiko (1998), 'The "Eschatology" of Japanese new and new new religions: from Tenrikyo to Kofuku-no-Kagaku', Japanese Religions 23, 125–42

External links

 

Japanese new religions
Religious organizations established in 1986
Religious organizations based in Japan
1986 establishments in Japan
Cults
COVID-19 misinformation